Adavi Donga is a 1985 Telugu-language film directed by K. Raghavendra Rao. It stars Chiranjeevi, Radha, Sharada, Rao Gopal Rao and others. Chakravarthy composed the music. The film was recorded as a Hit at the box office.

Plot
Viswam [Sreedhar Surapaneni] and Vasundhara [Sarada], are an ideal couple who lives near a forest to educate the illiterate forest dwellers to improve their quality of life, and earn more money. Thodella Appala Naidu [Rao Gopal Rao], along with his aides exploit the poor villagers. He buys their products at a very low cost and sells them at a higher price in the nearby town. With the help of Viswam and Vasundhara, they recognize the value of their products and start selling by themselves in the town. Appala Naidu goes to Viswam's house, and propose to them to join hands with him so they would collectively exploit the people. When they reject that proposal, he decides to eliminate them.

Appala Naidu kills one of the tribals and accuses Viswam of that crime. When the police take away Viswam, goons try to attack Vasundhara. Vasundhara hides her baby Kalidasu (Chiranjeevi) in a nearby bush and runs away to escape. Meanwhile, the baby is found by an elephant who raises him as his own child in the forest along with other animals. Sharada is shocked when she found out that her baby is missing and her husband is wrongly convicted and send to jail. She also pleads to his brother (Jaggayya), who is a police officer, to save her husband. But he could not do anything legally, because the charges framed against Viswam are systematically planned by Appala Naidu.

Years later, Radhika (Radha) visits the forest along with her friends and is attacked by goons. She is saved by Kalidasu, he later finds her house to return her radio she lost in the forest. Kalidasu kisses her while leaving after noticing her friend bidding goodbye with a kiss. Radhika instantly falls in love with him and sets out to the forest in search of him. She is chased by a tiger and falls into the river, where a deadly crocodile chases her. Kalidasu once again saves her life and takes her to his place. There, both of them fall for each other.

Poachers had been trying to kidnap an elephant for a very long time and are unable to do so because Kalidasu always saves them. The poachers frame Kalidasu for the murder of an honest police officer. Kalidasu and Radhika are chased by the police, when Kalidasu is wounded by a gunshot. Vasundhara finds them and helps them. The village doctor identifies him as Vasundhara's child with the Shivalingam tattoo, which is on his shoulder, but Kalidasu is unable to speak and understand her. Radhika is with the elephant and its calf illustrates to him that Vasundhara is his mother.

Kalidasu is arrested by the police and is tortured in the jail. He breaks out of jail and ends up beating all the policemen. Vasundhara promises to educate her son and will take revenge against the villain. She teaches him everything and makes him a legitimate man. The rest of the story narrates how Kalidasu takes revenge against the villain.

Cast
Chiranjeevi as Kalidasu
Radha as Radhika
Sharada as Vasundhara, Kalidasu's mother
Sreedhar Surapaneni as Viswam, Kalidasu's father
Rao Gopal Rao as Thodella Appalanaidu
Ranganath as Sathish, Forest officer 
Jaggayya as Vinod, Vasundhara's brother, Circle Inspector
Allu Rama Lingaiah as Avadhani
Nutan Prasad as Kondala Naidu
Tammareddy Chalapathi Rao as Puligadu
P. L. Narayana as Sureedu
P. J. Sarma
Mada Venkateswara Rao
Narra Venkateswara Rao
Telephone Satyanarayana
Chidathala Apparao
Rajesh Khanna (Cameo)
 Varalakshmi
 Master Sandesh
 Sakuntala
 Mamata
 Durga
 Parameswari

Soundtrack
 "Challagali" - 
 "Idhi Oka Nanadanavanamu" - 
 "Om Namashivaya" - 
 "Vana Vana Vandanam" - 
 "Veera Vikrama" -

References

External links
 

1985 films
Films directed by K. Raghavendra Rao
Films scored by K. Chakravarthy
1980s Telugu-language films
Tarzan films
Films set in forests
Films with screenplays by the Paruchuri brothers